Valerio Belli (c. 1468–1546), also known as Valerio Vicentino, was a celebrated medallist, gem engraver, goldsmith, who with Giovanni Bernardi, who was twenty years younger, was the leading specialist in intaglios engraved in rock crystal, a difficult luxury form which Belli pioneered.  These were highly sought after by wealthy Italian collectors. Though described as being "engraved", the intaglios are cut by drills, sometimes quite deeply, and developed their style from classical coins and engraved gems, to give "smoothly and eloquently orchestrated figural compositions".  Castings of many of the crystal carvings were taken in wax and them used to make metal plaquettes, which Belli also designed and made de novo. He was described as a goldsmith, though no surviving works are known, and had some role at the Papal mint, though no coins are clearly attributable to him.

Born in Vicenza, he was also active in Rome, his most important period, and Venice before returning to his native city in later life. In metal he designed many portrait medals and plaquettes, including copies of his works in crystal.  He was mentioned by the art historian Giorgio Vasari, and drawn by Parmigianino (now Museum Boijmans Van Beuningen). Another profile portrait bust in stone relief is in the Victoria and Albert Museum, and there is a similar self-portrait medal. A small round portrait, dated 1517 and formerly owned by Kenneth Clark, may be by Raphael.

His most famous work is a casket, now in the Pitti Palace in Florence, commissioned by Pope Clement VII as a wedding present to the future King Henry II of France and Catherine de' Medici.  This has 24 scenes from the Passion of Jesus in crystal.

Notes

References
 Burns, Howard, Marco Collareta and Davide Gasparotto, Valerio Belli Vicentino, 1468 – c. 1546, Vicenza, Italy, Neri Pozza, 2000.
 Melville-Jones, John R., article "Valerio Belli" in The Dictionary of Art (1006)
 
 Wilson, Carolyn C., Renaissance Small Bronze Sculpture and Associated Decorative Arts, 1983, National Gallery of Art (Washington),

External links 

1460s births
1546 deaths
Italian engravers
Italian medallists
16th-century medallists